Mercedes is a 1993 Egypt movie directed by Yousry Nasrallah.

Plot
A man called Noubi after the death of his father is set to search for his step brother to inherit the father's property. Noubi has to get to him before he is killed by his step mother.

Cast
 Seif Abdelrahman 
 Ahmad Kamal 
 Abla Kamel
 Magdy Kamel 
 Tahiyyah Karyuka 
 Bassem Samra 
 Zaki Fatin Abdel Wahab
 Yousra

References

Egyptian drama films
1993 films